Audacy, previously known as Radio.com, is a free broadcast and Internet radio platform owned by the namesake company Audacy, Inc. (formerly known as Entercom). The Audacy platform functions as a music recommender system and is the national umbrella brand for the company’s radio network aggregating its over 235 local radio stations across the United States. In addition, the service includes thousands of podcasts, created for the platform, hosted elsewhere, or station programming on demand. It was originally created by CBS Radio and was acquired by the former Entercom as part of the company's takeover of CBS Radio. The service's main competitors are rival station group iHeartMedia's iHeartRadio, and TuneIn. Audacy is available online, via mobile devices, and devices such as Chromecast and Amazon Fire TV.

History

The radio.com domain was formerly owned by CNET Networks, which purchased it and tv.com from the nonprofit Internet Multicasting Service for $30,000 in 1996. CNET, and in turn the radio.com domain, was acquired by CBS Corporation (the parent company of CBS Radio at the time) in 2008.

Radio.com launched on July 16, 2010, under CBS Radio. It was originally launched as a central website to stream all of CBS's then 130 radio stations, Last.fm and other CBS properties. Among the original features were currently playing information, song history, station and genre searches, presets, blogs, newsfeeds, and social media tools. Later that year the service launched its first app for iOS. In addition the service added custom channels and music from AOL Radio and Yahoo Music. In 2015, the service added a music video streaming option. These deals eventually ended quietly, especially after AOL and Yahoo's mergers into Oath.

Entercom acquired CBS Radio, including Radio.com, on November 17, 2017.

Throughout early and mid-2018, disparate individual mobile apps and sites for Entercom's legacy stations (sometimes developed outside Entercom by local third parties for individual stations, and often not being hosted universally by one provider) were withdrawn from the iTunes Store and Google Play, uniting all of Entercom's web and mobile efforts for their properties solely under the Radio.com app and website. The CBS Radio stations, which were part of "CBS Local" sites with their former sister television stations, also saw their main web presences moved to sub-domains of Radio.com. Some of the former CBS Local domains in markets where CBS only had radio stations remained online until late 2021 despite no longer hosting local radio content, instead carrying content from the nearest CBS-owned television station.

 On June 25, 2018, Entercom announced that Radio.com would become the exclusive streaming provider for all of its stations, ending its relationship with the third-party service TuneIn. Stations previously owned by Entercom pre-merger were removed on July 6, and former CBS Radio stations were removed on August 1. At that time, Entercom's stations would also begin promoting the service, in particular, suffixing "a Radio.com station" after their legal station identifications at the top of each hour. Smart speaker integration of the service was launched within the same period.

On February 7, 2019, Entercom launched stations for CNN, CNN International, HLN, Bloomberg Radio and Bloomberg Television on Radio.com along with podcasts from Turner Podcast Network via deals with Bloomberg L.P. and Turner Broadcasting. Two weeks later, Radio.com reached deals to add Bonneville International and Cox Media Group stations and podcasts to the platform.

On September 25, 2019, Salem Media Group and Alpha Media stations were made available on the service. Beasley Broadcast Group stations joined the service on November 11, 2020.

In October 2019, the app debuted a feature called "Rewind", where a number of Entercom's spoken word content stations maintain a 24-hour on-demand buffer of programming that can be accessed through rewind, fast-forward and skip back/forward controls.

On November 25, 2019, Disney Channels Worldwide agreed to terms to feature Radio Disney and Radio Disney Country's streams on the service; they were removed in January 2021 as Disney wound down their American radio operations, excluding ESPN Radio. Disney-branded music stations returned to the Audacy app in a new deal in August 2022. 

On March 30, 2021, Entercom rebranded both the company itself and Radio.com as Audacy. The end tag of Audacy's station identifications was then changed to identify them as "an Audacy station", along with a seven-note sounder whose tone varies with a station's format (such as a guitar playing it for a rock station, or a softer sound for a 'Mix'-like station). The end tag for all Audacy's stations was changed once again in July 2022 to "Always live on the free Audacy app." Since the rebrand, Audacy, Inc. has put the Radio.com domain up for auction on December 29, 2022, with a minimum required bid of $2.5 million (USD).

On August 17, 2021, Audacy announced a content distribution partnership with Urban One to bring premium live and on-demand audio content to its platform. Urban One will add its stations to Audacy's digital platform as part of the partnership.

On September 15, 2021, Audacy announced that Cumulus Media-owned radio stations and podcasts will be made available on its platform.

On July 19, 2022, Audacy announced a redesign of their player on their website and their app to include enhanced features such as "Enhanced Rewind" allowing listeners to rewind spoken-word programming, curated discovery of content, seamless cross-device functionality, and enriched podcast listening.

Availability and supported devices
In addition to traditional desktop availability, the service is available via iOS/WatchOS and Android mobile and tablet devices, along with Amazon Alexa and Google Assistant-compatible smart speakers and other devices.

Streaming of Audacy content is geo-restricted to the United States. In addition, local advertising from the advertisers of the nearest Audacy cluster of stations to a listener is substituted over a station's own advertising, along with traditional national advertising, public service announcements, and Audacy features such as music news, trivia, and other minutia.

MLB broadcasts on their sports stations are also geo-restricted to within the station's broadcast area. Listeners outside the station's broadcast area as defined by the League will hear this message: "Thank you for tuning in to this Major League Baseball game on Audacy. If you are hearing this message, you may be listening in from a location that is outside of the approved streaming area. Due to restrictions from the MLB, we are prohibited from broadcasting the play-by-play portion of this game outside of areas around the station's primary broadcast market. If you are outside of the primary broadcast area, we recommend looking up your team's local AM/FM radio affiliates, and see if there is one in your area. Thank you."

See also
AccuRadio
Channel Q, an LGBTQ radio network 
iHeartRadio – main competitor
TuneIn

References

External links

Audacy, Inc.
Internet properties established in 2010
Internet radio in the United States
CBS Radio
American music websites
Former CBS Interactive websites
Podcasting companies
Universal Windows Platform apps